Pavlos Haikalis (also Chaikalis) is a Greek actor and politician.

Biography
Pavlos Haikalis was born in Katakolo, Elis, on 30 October 1959. He, and his older brother Thanasis Haikalis (1948-2022), was raised by his mother Nikoleta because by the time Pavlos Haikalis was 10-year-old his father Giorgos Haikalis, who was a travel agent, passed away. After two years they started the health problems of his mother, he and his brother began working at variety of odd jobs for livelihood. He worked as waiter, labourer and warehouseman at factory, newsstand kioskman, detective and others. 

Thanasis Haikalis was a clerk at the Sivitanidios Public School of Trades and Vocations in Kallithea, Attica, after his retirement was relocated to his origin town of Katakolo, Elis, where was engaged in amateur acting became a member of the local theatre group Trojan Horse. Although his brother passed away on 11 November 2022, at the same day Pavlos Haikalis acted at the Apollon Theatre in Pyrgos, Elis playing his brother’s role on the play The late mother of the lady of the theatre group Trojan Horse.  

Pavlos Haikalis relocated in Athens after he was failed at the last grade of gymnasium school (now lyceum school). He studied acting at Athens’s Drama School Giorgos Theodosiadis, after actor Ilias Logothetis motivated him to enroll at it. 
He served his military service at armored forces on the borders of Greece. Nearly the end of his military service, he was invited by the drama school to act to the theatrical play End of the Journey at the Amiral Theatre, in Athens, with actors Aggelos Antonopoulos and Danis Katranidis. Later he was acted at the play Our Person with Lakis Komninos and Eleni Erimou. His acting career includes many films such as Safe Sex (1999), The Limousine (2013), and TV series such as the ERT2’s Androklis and his lions  (1985), Mega’s Fifty Fifty (2005-2007 and 2010-2011) starring together with Petros Filippidis and Sakis Boulas, Mega’s The Block of Flats (2008-2011).  
Also he performed as a voice actor took part at the ERT1’s puppetry series Froutopia (1985-1988).

Regarding the theatrical play Nikotitanikos which was scheduled to be made its premiere on 25 December 2021 at Henio Theatre, Paralimni, Cyprus, Pavlos Haikalis, who was participating as actor, announced that «I had an inner need to work. But it is my last work at theatre and I am leaving. And that is because none of my colleagues to have a problem. I want everyone to be happy». In 2022 Pavlos Haikalis announced that he became astrologer providing astrology consultant services, saying that he through astrology will help women who trying to conceive.  

In 2021 from four women and one man they made public accusations against Pavlos Haikalis include verbal abuse, unacceptable behavior, harassment by telephone call, attempted rape of female. In his own public statement, Pavlos Haikalis denies all five accusations against him. The Hellenic Actors’ Union (SEI) at its general session on 10 April 2022 has unanimously decided the lifelong removal of Pavlos Haikalis from its registry of members.

Political career
From 18 July 2015 until 28 August 2015 he was the Deputy Minister for Labour and Social Solidarity in the coalition government of Alexis Tsipras. From May 2012 until August 2015 Haikalis was a member of the Hellenic Parliament for the Independent Greeks representing the Attica constituency. Before joining the cabinet he was spokesman of his party for social security.

Haikalis has admitted that as a taxpayer he had not declared an invoice of 45.000 euros on his annual income tax declaration, which is being submitted to the Independent Authority for Public Revenue (AADE). In June 2015, Pavlos Haikalis made some xenophobic statements, said «aliens are blame for the growth in crime and unemployment» and «Greek do not become, but you are born». 

During the summer of 2015 drew a large amount of media attention because it revealed that Pavlos Haikalis owned an offshore company based in Cyprus since 2008 while as a then Independent Greeks (ANEL) lawmaker of the Hellenic Parliament he did not declare it on his provenance of wealth declaration, also called "pothen esches" (a formal document listing sources of income and assets that is submitted to auditing authorities annually by Greek lawmakers) for which a parliament committee monitors the origin of wealth declaration. Pothen Esches expressly forbids Members of Hellenic Parliament from owning or participating in an offshore company, thus it is incompatible with the holding of a seat as lawmaker of parliament. The Independent Greeks political party was forced to exclude him from their ballot in 2015 parliamentary elections.

Personal life
His first marriage was with actress Evdokia Pentzaki with whom he had one son Giorgos Haikalis (born 1990) from whom he had one grandson (born 2019). His second marriage was with actress Margarita Soldatou. Haikalis was married her third wife police officer Maria Lykou with civil marriage on 6 November 2015 in a ceremony at the Town Hall of Rafina, Attica, but four years later in 2019 they divorced and Haikalis announced that he assumes responsibility.

Television

Notes and references

External links
 
 at retrodb.gr (in Greek)
 

1958 births
Politicians from Elis
Living people
20th-century Greek male actors
21st-century Greek male actors
Independent Greeks politicians
Greek MPs 2012 (May)
Greek MPs 2012–2014
Greek MPs 2015 (February–August)
Greek actor-politicians
People from Pyrgos, Elis